The Volcano Park in Mayen-Koblenz is a geopark in the rural district of Mayen-Koblenz in the eastern Vulkan Eifel, Germany. It was founded in 1996 and wraps around the Laacher See (between Brohl-Lützing, Andernach, Plaidt, Mendig and Mayen). Together with the Volcano Park, Brohltal/Laacher See and the Vulkan Eifel Nature and Geo-Park, it forms part of the national Eifel Volcano Land Geo-Park (Geopark Vulkanland Eifel). The three parks are connected by the 280-kilometre-long German Volcano Route.

The Volcano Park illustrates volcanism in the Eifel, how the present-day landscape developed, and the exploitation of basalt, pumice and tuff since Roman times. It incorporates exhibits on volcanology, archaeology and industrial history, with educational trails and information signs. The museum incorporates a total of 25 stations, which can be combined in a single visit using four roads plus hiking and bicycle paths.

On 10 July 2010, the Volcano Park was honoured with the "European Union Cultural Heritage Prize" of the heritage protection organisation Europa Nostra, in the category of "Education, Instruction, Training and Consciousness Building". In 2003, the park's project at the Meurin Roman mine had won the same prize.

In 2010 the park had a record 220,000 visitors.

Stations in the Volcano Park

Blue Route - Plaidt
 Rauschermühle information centre
Central departure point in Plaidt: information centre and museum with exhibits on the development of the Eifel mountains and the history of quarrying and mining
 Meurin Roman mine, at Kretz
 Kruft valley
Tuff deposits from the Laacher See volcanic eruption
 Karmelenberg (a cinder cone) and St. Mary's Chapel
 Roman grave monument in Ochtendung
Built of tuff from the Meurin mine

Red Route - Mendig
 Mendig lava dome
Museum with information on the history of volcanism and the geological history of the region
 Mendig lava cellars
3 square kilometres of chambers hewn out of the volcanic rock 32 metres under the town of Mendig
 Museum lay (cliff-face)
Open-air exhibit on the life of mine workers extracting and processing basaltic lava
 Wingert cliff-face
Cliff-face 50 metres high which records volcanological information about the eruption of the Laacher See volcano

Yellow Route - Andernach
 Andernach geyser
Tallest cold-water geyser in the world
 Andernach Town museum
Exhibit of historical products made of basaltic lava and tuff
 Nastberg
Former volcano at the Eich district of Andernach.
 Roman mound-grave in Nickenich
Built of tuff from the Meurin mine
 Pellenz archaeological museum in Nickenich
Contains finds from the prehistoric and historic, including Roman, periods
 Eppelsberg
Erosion has created a unique view of the interior of a 230,000-year-old volcano
 Mauerley near the Veitskopf
Roman quarry in the lava flow from the Veitskopf volcano
 Hohe Buche
Volcano whose basalt was used for construction in the Roman period and the early Middle Ages, for example in the Roman bridge at Trier

Green Route - Mayen
 Kottenheim Winfeld
Quarry where Mayen Basalt Lava is extracted from the major lava field of the Bellerberg Volcano
 The Ahl at St. Johann
Bizarre rock formations created by the eruption of the Hochsimmer volcano
 Lay (cliff-face) at Ettringen
Former site of basalt and tuff mining operations with remains of cranes, crane platforms, railway lines and buildings
 Ettringen Bellerberg / Kottenheim Büden
West and east flanks of the large Bellerberg Volcano
 Mayen Eifel Museum in Genoveva Castle, with German slate mine
 Mayen quarry
Oldest and most important source of Mayen Basalt Lava
 Katzenberg
Site of the largest late Roman hill fort in the Eifel and Hunsrück
 Boos double maar
Twin maars at Boos

References

Sources
 Karl-Heinz Schumacher and Wilhelm Meyer. Ed. Karl Peter Wiemer. Geopark Vulkanland Eifel. Lava-Dome und Lavakeller in Mendig. Rheinische Landschaften 57. Cologne: Rheinischer Verein für Denkmalpflege und Landschaftsschutz, 2006. 
 Werner P. d'Hein. Nationaler Geopark Vulkanland Eifel. Ein Natur- und Kulturführer. Düsseldorf: Gaasterland, 2006.

External links

 Official homepage

Nature parks in Rhineland-Palatinate
Geoparks in Germany
Volcanoes of Germany
Landforms of Rhineland-Palatinate